Lothar Barthel (born 28 June 1937) was a German politician of the Christian Democratic Union (CDU) and former member of the German Bundestag.

Life 
Barthel had been a member of the CDU in the GDR since 1977 and was a member of the CDU district executive Gera and the CDU party executive before 1989.

In March 1990, Barthel was elected to the Volkskammer in the Gera constituency on behalf of the CDU. In October 1990, he was one of the 144 members of parliament sent to the Bundestag by the Volkskammer. He was a member of the Bundestag until December 1990.

Literature

References

1937 births
Members of the Bundestag for Thuringia
Members of the Bundestag 1987–1990
Members of the Bundestag for the Christian Democratic Union of Germany
Members of the 10th Volkskammer
Living people